× Elearethusa is an intergeneric hybrid of orchids (family Orchidaceae). Its parents' genera are Arethusa and Eleorchis. It is abbreviated Elsa in trade journals.

References 

Arethusinae
Orchid nothogenera